.rex may refer to:

A file extension used by Rexx scripts
A file extension used by REX2